Wingårdh arkitektkontor is an architectural firm based in the Sweden. The practice is led by its founder, Gert Wingårdh. It has about 150 employees (2010).

References
Gert Wingårdh, architect. Rasmus Waern. Birkhäuser, 2001.
Gert Wingårdh. Thirty years of architecture through four decades. Ed. Mikael Nanfeldt. Birkhäuser 2008.
Wingårds. Falk Jaeger. JOVIS Verlag Berlin 2010.

External links
  
 

Architecture firms of Sweden